Hampton Ferry may refer to:

England

Hampton Ferry (River Avon), a ferry across the River Avon in Worcestershire
Hampton Ferry (River Thames), a ferry across the River Thames to the west of London
Hampton Loade Ferry, a ferry across the River Severn in Shropshire

See also 
 Hampton (disambiguation)